Walter de Burgh, 1st Earl of Ulster, 2nd Lord of Connaught (1230 – 28 July 1271) also spelt Burke or Bourke, was an Irish peer from the House of Burgh.

Biography
De Burgh was the second son of Richard Mór de Burgh, 1st Lord of Connaught and Egidia de Lacy. He founded Athassel Priory.

In 1243, he succeeded his father as Lord of Connacht. In a royal order from Westminster in September 1247, Sir John Fitzgeoffrey was charged by the king with seizing the lands of Walter de Burgh's older brother Richard, who had died. The de Burgh lands in Connaught were being held by John de Livet, likely the son of Gilbert de Lyvet, one of the earliest Lord Mayors of Dublin and Marmaduke de Eschales (Scales).

In 1264, he married a cousin, Lady Maud de Lacy, only daughter and heiress of Hugh de Lacy, 1st Earl of Ulster (by his second wife, Emmeline de Riddlesford, the granddaughter of Walter de Riddlesford). That year De Burgh was created Earl of Ulster in her right. In 1270, he and Walter de Ufford, the Justiciar of Ireland, were defeated by Aedh mac Felim Ua Conchobair at Áth an Chip.

He married secondly Aveline, daughter of Sir John Fitzgeoffrey, Justiciar of Ireland, by his wife, Isabel Bigod.

He died, aged about 40, in Galway, and was succeeded by his eldest son, Richard Óg de Burgh, 2nd Earl of Ulster ('The Red Earl of Ulster'). Other children were three sons, Theobald, William and Thomas, and a daughter, Egidia, who married Sir James Stewart (1260–1309), 5th High Steward of Scotland.

Ancestry

Notes

References

 
 Ancestral Roots of Certain American Colonists Who Came to America Before 1700 by Frederick Lewis Weis; Lines 73-30, 177B-8, 177B-9.
 The Tribes and customs of Hy-Many, John O'Donovan, 1843
 The Surnames of Ireland, Edward MacLysaght, Dublin, 1978.
 The Anglo-Normans in Co. Galway: the process of colonisation, Patrick Holland, Journal of the Galway Archaeological and Historical Society, vol. 41 (1987–88)
 Excavation on the line of the medieval town defences of Loughrea, Co. Galway, J.G.A.& H.S., vol. 41 (1987–88)
 Anglo-Norman Galway; rectangular earthworks and moated sites, Patrick Holland, J.G.A. & H.S., vol. 46 (1993)
  Rindown Castle: a royal fortress in Co. Roscommon, Sheelagh Harbison, J.G.A. & H.S., vol. 47 (1995)
 The Anglo-Norman landscape in County Galway; land-holdings, castles and settlements, Patrick Holland, J.G.A.& H.S., vol. 49 (1997)
 Annals of Ulster at CELT: Corpus of Electronic Texts at University College Cork
 Annals of Tigernach at CELT: Corpus of Electronic Texts at University College Cork
Revised edition of McCarthy's synchronisms at Trinity College Dublin.

1230 births
1271 deaths
Burgh
Nobility from County Limerick
People from County Galway
13th-century Irish people
Normans in Ireland
Walter